Mordellistena delicatula is a beetle in the genus Mordellistena of the family Mordellidae. It was described in 1906 by Dury.

References

delicatula
Beetles described in 1906